"Orpheus" is a song by the English singer-songwriter David Sylvian. It is the second single from his album Secrets of the Beehive.

Formats and track listing 
All songs written by David Sylvian
European 7" single (VS 1043)
"Orpheus" – 4:46
"Mother and Child" – 3:09

European 12" single (VST 1043)
"Orpheus" – 4:46
"Mother and Child" – 3:09
"The Devil's Own" – 3:08

Personnel
David Sylvian – vocals, acoustic guitar, synths
Ryuichi Sakamoto – piano, synths
Steve Jansen – drums
Danny Thompson – double bass
Phil Palmer – slide guitar
Mark Isham – flugelhorn
Brian Gascoigne – orchestral arrangement

Accolades 

(*) designates unordered lists.

References

External links
 

1988 singles
David Sylvian songs
Songs written by David Sylvian
1987 songs
Virgin Records singles